These are lists of the lowest-income counties in the United States, based on measures of per capita personal income and median household income. This article lists counties by per capita personal income (PCPI), a more comprehensive measurement of an individual's income that per capita income (PCI).

50 counties/parishes with lowest per capita personal income
Two common measurements of the average annual income of individuals in the United States are: per capita income (PCI) and per capital personal income (PCPI). Per capita personal income is the more comprehensive of the two measures, and thus PCPI for an individual, county, or state will be higher than PCI. The following table is a listing of counties by PCPI.

50 counties/parishes with lowest median household income

See also
List of lowest-income places in the United States
List of highest-income counties in the United States
List of United States counties by per capita income
Persistent poverty county

References

External links
 Bureau of Economic Analysis
 US Census, Small Area Income and Poverty Estimates, State and County Estimates for 2021

Income in the United States
Income, lowest
Poverty in the United States
Counties Lowest Income